Highest median voting rules are cardinal voting rules, where the winning candidate is a candidate with the highest median rating. As these employ ratings, each voter rates the different candidates on an ordered, numerical or verbal scale.

The various highest median rules differ in their treatment of ties, i.e., the method of ranking the candidates with the same median rating.

Proponents of highest median rules argue that they faithfully reflect the voter's opinion, that they satisfy the independence of irrelevant alternatives and, not being ranked ballots, do not fall within the scope of Arrow's impossibility theorem. Critics point out that highest median rules violate the Condorcet criterion: a candidate can in principle be elected even if all voters but one prefer another candidate.

Definition and notation 
Let  be the set of candidates,  the set of voters, and  an ordered finite set of ratings (e.g. the following ratings: "Very good", "Good", "Average", "Bad").

For any candidate , 's median rating  is the median rating among the ratings that  received from voters. For example, if there are ten voters and if candidate  receives three ratings "Good", six ratings "Average", and one rating "Bad", its median rating  is "Average".

When different candidates share the same median rating, a tie-breaking rule is required. This tie-breaking rule characterizes the highest median rule at use.

Tie-breaking rules often make use of two additional statistics about a candidate 's ratings:
In the example above, the three ratings "Good" are above 's median "Average", so . 
In the example above, this correspond to the rating "Bad", so .

Examples 

 The typical judgment orders the candidates according to the largest difference between their share of proponents and opponents, i.e. according to the formula:  (the indices  are omitted for simplicity). In the above example, and identifying "Average" with the grade , we have .
 The usual judgment is the rule said to offer the best properties, but it orders the candidates according to a slightly more complex formula: ; compared to the typical judgment, this leads to a more prominent score difference in small changes of number of proponents and opponents when the median share is low, as the equation approaches 0.5 both as either  or  approaches 0.5 (neither can actually be 0.5, as the median lies at the halfway point by definition).
 The central judgment orders the candidates according to the highest ratio between the shares of proponents and opponents, that is to say according to the formula:  (where  is an arbitrarily small number that simply allows the denominator to remain positive); compared to the typical judgment, this leads to a more prominent score difference in small changes of number of proponents and opponents when the median share is high, as the equation approaches 0.5 both as either  or  approaches 0.5. In fact, the usual judgment  is equivalent to the central judgment .
 The majority judgment considers the candidate who is closest to having a rating other than its median and breaks the tie based on that rating. This is equivalent to ordering the candidates according to their score , defined by the following formula (the symbol  denotes the indicator function) : .
 The Bucklin rules are close to the highest median rules but have been developed for ranked rules. They order the candidates according to the formula: . In a ranked rule, this is equivalent to counting first choice votes first. If one candidate has a majority, that candidate wins. Otherwise the second choices are added to the first choices. If a candidate with a majority vote is found, the winner is the candidate with the most votes accumulated. Lower rankings are added as needed.
 Approval voting corresponds to the degenerate case where there are only two possible ratings: approval and disapproval. In this particular case, all the tie-breaking rules are equivalent, and the Condorcet criterion is satisfied.

See also 
 Cardinal voting
 Majority judgment
 Bucklin voting
 Electoral System
 Comparison of electoral systems

References

Further reading

External links 
 R package implementing different highest median rules, as well as range voting: HighestMedianRules.

Cardinal electoral systems
Electoral systems